Eupithecia slossonata is a moth in the family Geometridae first described by James Halliday McDunnough in 1949. It is found in the US states of Florida, Georgia, Kentucky and Maryland.

The forewings are deep smoky brown with blackish cross lines. The hindwings are pale smoky with a quite prominent, oblique, postmedian line.

References

Moths described in 1949
slossonata
Moths of North America